Silu may refer to:
 Silu (film)
 Silu (song)
 Silu, Iran (disambiguation)
 Zhan Silu, Chinese prelate